Lynwood Thomas "Schoolboy" Rowe (January 11, 1910 – January 8, 1961) was an American right-handed pitcher in Major League Baseball, primarily for the Detroit Tigers (1932–42) and Philadelphia Phillies (1943, 1946–49). He was a three-time All-Star (1935, 1936 & 1947), and a member of three Tigers' World Series teams (& ).

Early years (1925–1933)
Born in Waco, Texas, and brought up in El Dorado, Arkansas, the  Rowe was an all-around athlete, competing in tennis, golf, and football, as well as baseball. He received the nickname "Schoolboy" while playing on a men's team as a 15-year-old high school student. In 1932, Rowe played for the Beaumont Exporters in the Texas League, leading the league with a 2.34 earned run average and winning 19 games. The 1932 Exporters won 100 games and the Texas League championship, with Rowe pitching and future Detroit Tigers teammate Hank Greenberg leading the team in batting. Greenberg and Rowe were both called up to the Tigers in 1933.

The 1934 and 1935 American League pennants
Rowe joined the Tigers in 1933, and the following year won 24 games (a 24–8 record), including an American League record 16 consecutive wins. In the 1934 World Series against the St. Louis Cardinals' Gashouse Gang, Rowe was 1–1 in two starts with a 2.95 ERA. In Game 2, Rowe pitched a 12-inning complete game, allowing two earned runs and retiring 22 consecutive batters. In Game 6, Rowe pitched another complete game, allowing four runs, but Paul "Daffy" Dean held the Tigers to only three. Schoolboy finished fourth in the American League's 1934 Most Valuable Player voting behind teammates Mickey Cochrane, who won, and Charlie Gehringer.

Rowe had another strong year in 1935 as the Tigers won their second consecutive American League pennant. He finished the regular season with a record of 19–13 with 21 complete games and a league-leading six shutouts and was selected for the American League All-Star team. Rowe went 1–2 in the 1935 World Series, despite a 2.51 ERA. He was the losing pitcher in the first game, a 3–0 Cubs victory, striking out eight batters, pitching a complete game and allowing only two earned runs. In Game 3, Rowe got the win, pitching four innings in relief. In Game 5, Rowe threw another complete game, allowing two earned runs as the Tigers lost 3–1. However, Detroit would go on to win Game 6 to clinch the World Series.

Rowe developed into a pitcher with tremendous power and control. In the 1934 and 1935 seasons, he had 149 strikeouts (third in the AL) and 140 strikeouts (second in the AL), respectively. He also led the American League in strikeout-to-walk ratio in both 1934 and 1935 and finished in the top four in the league in bases on balls per 9 innings pitched seven times, including a career and league best 1.31 in 1943.

Rowe also contributed to the Tigers' success in 1934 and 1935 with his hitting. In 1934, he hit for a .303 batting average and had eight doubles, two home runs, and 22 RBIs in 109 at bats. In 1935, he raised his average to .312 with three home runs and 28 RBIs in 109 at bats. In his 15 seasons in the big leagues, Rowe hit 18 home runs (14th best in major league history for a pitcher) and 153 RBIs. His career batting average was .263 (239-for-909).

"How'm I Doing, Edna?"
With his southern charm and eccentricities, Schoolboy Rowe became a fan favorite in Detroit. He was known as a superstitious player who carried amulets, talismans, and charms in his pockets, always picked up his glove with his left hand and even talked to the ball.

Rowe was loved particularly by female fans for his good looks and public devotion to his high-school sweetheart, Edna Mary Skinner. During a September 13, 1934, nationally broadcast interview on the popular Rudy Vallee radio show, Rowe asked his fiancee, "How'm I doing, Edna honey?" The line became famous and the incident endeared Schoolboy to women across the country, but led to relentless heckling from fans and opposing players, who enjoyed taunting him with his own words: "How'm I doing, Edna?"

During his 16-game win streak in 1934, a reporter asked him for his secret, and Schoolboy responded that he would "just eat a lot of vittles, climb on that mound, wrap my fingers around the ball and say to it, 'Edna, honey, let's go.'"

Prior to the 1934 World Series, the Detroit News brought Edna to Detroit to write about baseball, Schoolboy, cooking or whatever she pleased. Pictures of Edna and Schoolboy or Edna posing with Babe Ruth were published in the newspapers as the nation became caught up in the courtship of Schoolboy and Edna. The couple married shortly after the 1934 World Series.

Actor Nick LaMantia delivers the famous line "How'm I doing, Edna?" while playing Schoolboy Rowe in the 2015 feature film "Gore Orphanage."

Middle years (1936–1943)

Rowe continued his dominant pitching in 1936, with a 19–10 record for the Tigers. But in 1937 and 1938, Schoolboy's arm was showing wear, as he was limited to 31 and 21 innings before being sent down to the minor leagues.

In 1939, Rowe returned to the Tigers and, in 1940, he led the American League with an .842 winning percentage—a record of 16–3. His 16 wins, 3.46 ERA, and 138 Adjusted ERA+ (5th in AL) were instrumental in leading the Tigers to the 1940 pennant, and he finished No. 7 in that year's AL Most Valuable Player voting, though he fared badly in the 1940 World Series as he lost two games and had an ERA of 17.18. In Game 2, he gave up 5 runs in  innings, and was knocked out in the first inning of Game 6.
 
Rowe was sold to Brooklyn on April 30, 1942, and was 1–0 for the Dodgers.  In March 1943, he was sold to the Philadelphia Phillies. Schoolboy returned to his old form in 1943, compiling a 14–8 record and a 2.94 ERA and finishing No. 14 in the National League MVP voting.

The war years (1944–1945)
Schoolboy missed the 1944 and 1945 seasons to wartime service in the U.S. Navy. He was assigned to the Great Lakes Naval Training Station where his former manager, Mickey Cochrane, put together an All-Star baseball team that included Schoolboy, Bob Feller, Johnny Mize and Billy Herman. The 1944 Great Lakes team compiled a 48–2 record, including an 11–1 record against major league teams. Schoolboy played as an outfielder as well as a pitcher and led the Great Lakes team with a .446 batting average.

In one memorable game in August 1944, Rowe hit a double, a triple, and a home run for the Navy's Great Lakes team, and the local newspaper reported that "...it was his circuit clout which brought deafening roars from the 6,000 park customers. The 'Schoolboy' teed off on one of (Gerard) 'Slim' DeLion's slow curves and drove the horsehide straight over the center field fence, a tremendous wallop of at least 450 feet."

In September 1944, the Army and Navy staged a military service World Series in Hawaii, billed by locals as the "real World Series", because so many of the best players in baseball were in the service. Schoolboy Rowe pitched for the Navy team that also included Dom DiMaggio and Phil Rizzuto. Admiral Nimitz threw out the first pitch, and Rowe's Navy team swept the first six games and finally won eight while losing two and tying one.

Later years (1946–1961)
After serving two years in World War II, the 36-year-old "Schoolboy" returned to the Phillies in top form. In 1946, Rowe was 11–4, led the league in winning percentage, and had a career-low earned run average of 2.12. Rowe followed with another strong season in 1947, earning a final All-Star nod. That season, he also became the first and only pitcher in Major League history to be intentionally walked twice in the same game. He was released by the Phillies after the 1949 season and finished his pitching career in 1950, with San Diego in the Pacific Coast League.

Schoolboy had a career 158–101 record, 913 strikeouts, and a 3.87 ERA. He spent two seasons 1954-1955 as the Tigers' pitching coach. During this time, after the Tigers made the third out, Rowe would pick up the baseball, then hand or toss it to the Tiger pitchers as they came out of the dugout to go to the mound. He did this to each except Ned Garver, who superstitiously preferred to pick the ball up off the ground. Later, Rowe worked as a Tigers scout assigned to cover Arkansas, Louisiana, Mississippi, and East Texas.

Rowe died of a heart attack at age 50 on January 8, 1961, in El Dorado, Arkansas.

See also
1935 Detroit Tigers season
List of Major League Baseball all-time leaders in home runs by pitchers
Best pitching seasons by a Detroit Tiger

References

External links

Schoolboy Rowe at Baseball Biography
Time magazine article about Rowe, 1947

1910 births
1961 deaths
Major League Baseball pitchers
American League All-Stars
National League All-Stars
Detroit Tigers players
Brooklyn Dodgers players
Philadelphia Phillies players
Baseball players from Texas
People from Waco, Texas
Beaumont Exporters players
Montreal Royals players
Shreveport Sports players
San Diego Padres (minor league) players
Williamsport Tigers players
Detroit Tigers coaches
Detroit Tigers scouts
Major League Baseball pitching coaches
Buffalo Bisons (minor league) managers
People from El Dorado, Arkansas
United States Navy personnel of World War II